The 2009 Individual Speedway World Championship Grand Prix Qualification Meetings are a series of speedway meetings used to determine the three riders and one reserve who qualify for the 2009 Speedway Grand Prix. The top eight riders finishing the 2008 Grand Prix series automatically qualify for 2009.

Calendar

Allocation 
Qualifying Rules:
 Riders placed 1st to 7th + 1 reserve from each Qualifying Round will qualify for the semi-final.
 Riders placed 1st to 8th + 1 reserve from each Semi-Final will qualify for the Grand Prix Challenge. However, if no Polish rider qualifies to the Grand Prix Challenge, then only 7 riders + 1 reserve will qualify from Semi-Final 2.
 Riders will be balloted for the semi-finals and the Grand Prix Challenge.

Domestic Qualifications

Poland 
Domestic Qualifications for the 2009 Grand Prix and the 2008 Individual European Championship Krajowe eliminacje do Grand Prix 2009 i IME

Qualifying Rules:
 Riders placed 1st to 8th + 1 reserve in the semi-finals qualify for the Final.
 Riders placed 1st to 6th in the Domestic Final qualify for the Grand Prix Qualification. The seventh Polish rider and reserve are nominated by the Main Commission of Speedway Sport in Poland (GKSŻ).
 Riders placed 1st to 7th in the Domestic Final qualify to the Individual European Championship. The eighth Polish rider and reserve are nominated by the Main Commission of Speedway Sport in Poland (GKSŻ).

Results:

Qualifying rounds

Semi-finals

Grand Prix Challenge 
Grand Prix Challenge
September 14, 2008
 Zielona Góra
Referee:  Anthony Steele
Jury President:  Christer Bergström
Best Time: 59.66 sec -  Kenneth Bjerre in Heat 3
Change:
(2)  Jonas Davidsson → (18) Korneliussen
(15)  Daniel Nermark → (17) Pavlic

References and notes 
pzm.pl - FIM Calendar 2008
pzm.pl - Allocation

See also 
Speedway Grand Prix

2009

World Individual